James Robert McGowan (born May 30, 1960) is a Canadian actor. Best known for playing Mike Kessler, head of the Toronto-based Immigrations and Customs Security, in the television series The Border.

Filmography

Film

Television

Awards and nominations

References

External links

1960 births
Living people
Anglophone Quebec people
Canadian male television actors
Canadian male film actors
Concordia University alumni
Male actors from Montreal